Grupo Werthein (Werthein Group) is a holding company based in Argentina. It is owned and controlled by the Werthein family. Its activities began more than 100 years ago in the agribusiness sector.

History

León Werthein emigrated from Bassarabia in 1904 and arrived in Argentina, after coping with difficulties in the Russian Empire. The family established its home in a ranch of Miguel Riglos (La Pampa), and founded 'El Hebreo', a general store, which the first company owned by the group.

Founders

Daniel Werthein
Adrián Werthein
Gerardo Werthein
Darío Werthein

Company

Activities

 Telecommunications: Until 2017, the group was shareholder, originally along with Telecom Italia, of Sofora Telecomunicaciones S.A., which controlled Telecom Argentina.
 Agribusiness: The industry where Grupo Werthein both originated and began its consolidation process. They are involved in various businesses related to this activity: livestock genetics and meat production, commodity production, specialty crops and dried fruit. High-pedigree animals of Argentina - as Aberdeen Angus, Hereford, Braford and Brangus - are raised in their establishments. Grupo Werthein produces wheat, soybeans and corn (among others). Part of those commodities is industrialized in the plant located in Lima, Buenos Aires, and exported to global markets. In the fruit and vegetable market, they are engaged in processing and marketing of fruit derivatives, mainly apple. Their establishment is based in the Valley of Río
 Consumer goods: The group sells tea brands Cachamai and Té José and flavoured yerba mate Cachamate. Besides supplying the domestic market, the company exports to France, Spain, Japan, England, Saudi Arabia, Brazil and the United States, among other destinations.
 Insurance: By means of its participation in Caja de Ahorro y Seguro S.A., the group has more than 20 years of experience in the market. The company controls, among others, La Caja de Seguros S.A. and La Caja de Seguros de Retiro S.A. and owns 50% of La Caja Aseguradora Riesgos del Trabajo S.A. and La Estrella S.A. Compañía de Seguros de Retiro. It also has a minority stake in the Argentina subsidiary of Europ Assistance.
 Financial services: For 35 years it owned Banco Mercantil Argentino, which once had more than 60 branches nationwide. It also participated with the Standard Bank of South Africa in the acquisition of BankBoston Argentina (2007). The bank changed its name to Standard Bank until it was sold in 2011 to the Industrial and Commercial Bank of China. During the 1990s it was part of the Citicorp Equity Investments, which conducted numerous transactions in various sectors of the economy.
 Oil: Since 2006 the group has a joint venture together with Petrosiel (Sielecki family) and Energial for oil exploration in a 2,000 km² area of Salina Grande I in La Pampa. Their total reserves reach about 6.2 million barrels.
 Real estate: Through its companies, Grupo Werthein has built over 330,000 m² in different facilitites (Torres Figueroa Alcorta, Altos Porteños, Barrio La Damasia in San Fernando and Libertador and Paroissien in Núñez).
 Wines: Dario Werthein is president of Bodega Riglos, whose vineyards - located in Alto Valle de Uco - produce quality wines in the varieties Malbec, Cabernet Sauvignon, Cabernet Franc and Corte. Sophenia is a wine cellar with over 130 hectares of vines, in Tupungato, Mendoza. Their wines began trading in 2004 and are sold in 30 countries.
 Horse breeding and sports: Located at Capilla del Señor, Haras El Capricho was established in 1999 and has since conducted the international equestrian competition CSIO-W (horse jumping) for which renowned riders from all over the world have travelled to Argentina. Its president is Gerardo Werthein.

Investments, acquisitions and participations

 AFJP Activa (1994-1996)
 Banco Mercantil Argentino (1963-1993)
 Bank of America (2007)
 Bodega Riglos (2002)
 Cachay (2005)
 Caja de Ahorro y Seguro (1994)
 Citicorp Equity Investment (1992-1998)
 Citrex (1965-1979)
 EDELAP (1992-1997)
 Finca Flinchman (1980-1987)
 GNNW (1928)
 Haras El Capricho (1999)
 Hotel Llao Llao (1997)
 Industrias del Vestir Argentino (1970)
 Multicanal (1994)
 Telecom Argentina (2003)
 TGS (1992)
 Torneos y Competencias (1997)

Social responsibility

Grupo Werthein works in various social responsibility actions aimed at reducing the social gap and shorten distances by means of educational, inclusive, technological, environmental and sport activities.

The Wertheins have been carrying out social action initiatives related to the development of the community in which they are embedded.

 Noel Werthein was co-founder of Tel Aviv University together with George S. Wise en 1968, president of ORT Schools Argentina y president of the Argentina-Israel Chamber of Commerce.
 Julio Werthein was head of Asociación ORT-Escuelas Técnicas, UNESCO Goodwill Ambassador (1995) and president of Buenos Aires Stock Exchange (2002-2005).
 Leo Werthein was president of the Tzedaká Foundation and president of Argentine Angus Association.
 Daniel Werthein is former vice president of DAIA Foundation.
 Adrián Werthein is president of INEBA Foundation.
 Gerardo Werthein is president of Argentine Olympic Committee and member of IOC.
 Darío Werthein was president of the Tzedaká Foundation, current secretary of World ORT and member of the American Jewish Joint Distribution Committee.

References

External links
 

Companies based in Buenos Aires
Conglomerate companies established in 1928
1928 establishments in Argentina
Holding companies of Argentina
Holding companies established in 1928

de:Werthein (Familie)